The Dent de Broc (1,829 m) is a mountain of the Swiss Prealps, overlooking Broc and the Lake of Gruyère in the canton of Fribourg. It lies on the range north of the Vanil Noir, between the valleys of the Sarine and the Motélon.

From the Col des Combes (1,668 m), a trail leads to its summit.

References

External links
 Dent de Broc on Hikr

Mountains of Switzerland
Mountains of the Alps
Mountains of the canton of Fribourg
One-thousanders of Switzerland